Andreas Müller (born 20 July 2000) is a German professional footballer who plays as a defensive midfielder for 1. FC Magdeburg.

Career
Müller made his professional debut for 1. FC Magdeburg in the first round of the 2020–21 DFB-Pokal on 13 September 2020, coming on as a substitute in the 86th minute against 2. Bundesliga side Darmstadt 98, with the home match finishing as a 3–2 loss after extra time.

References

External links
 
 
 
 Statistics at Fussball.de

2000 births
Living people
People from Sinsheim
Sportspeople from Karlsruhe (region)
Footballers from Baden-Württemberg
German footballers
Association football midfielders
FC Astoria Walldorf players
1. FC Magdeburg players
3. Liga players
Regionalliga players